Al-ayyam al-tawila is a 1980 6-hour long biographical account of Saddam Hussein's attempted assassination of Abd al-Karim Qasim in 1959, although some sources also list a running time of 150 minutes.  It was filmed in 1980 and allegedly edited by Terence Young, who also directed three James Bond films. 

The film starred Hussein's cousin Saddam Kamal as Saddam and was directed by Tewfik Saleh.

External links

 (French subtitles, 125 minutes)
 (no subtitles, 100-minute version)

1980 films
1980s biographical films
1980s Arabic-language films
Biographical films about criminals
Biographical films about presidents
Biographical films about prime ministers
Biographical films about rebels
Films about assassinations
Films set in Baghdad
Films set in Iraq
Films shot in Iraq
History of the Ba'ath Party
Iraqi drama films
Propaganda films
Cultural depictions of Saddam Hussein
Films set in 1959
Films about coups d'état
Films directed by Tewfik Saleh